Smith is an impact crater on Mars, located in the Mare Australe quadrangle at 66.1°S latitude and 102.9°W longitude. It measures  in diameter and was named after English geologist William Smith (1769–1839). The name was approved by the International Astronomical Union (IAU) Working Group for Planetary System Nomenclature in 1973.

See also
 Climate of Mars
 Dust devil tracks
 Geology of Mars
 Impact event
 List of craters on Mars
 Ore resources on Mars
 Planetary nomenclature

References 
 

Mare Australe quadrangle
Impact craters on Mars